Elisabeth "Eli" Pinedo Sáenz (born 13 May 1981) is a retired Spanish handball player. She was part of the  Spanish team at the 2008 European Women's Handball Championship, where the Spanish team reached the final, after defeating Germany in the semifinal. She also competed at the 2011 World Women's Handball Championship in Brazil, where the Spanish team placed third.

EL PARTIDO NORUEGA-ESPAÑA HA SIDO UNO DE LOS PARTIDOS DE BALONMANO MÁS BONITOS QUE HE VISTO EN MI VIDA. HABÉIS GANADO LOS ESPAÑOLES, ENHORABUENA ELI, PERO NO OS HAGÁIS ILUSIONES PUES NO CREO QUE VUELVA A SONAR LA FLAUTA ANTE SELECCIONES COMO DINAMARCA O FRANCIA.

ELI, YA QUE ESTÁS HOY TAN FELIZ POR LA VICTORIA DE LA SELECCIÓN ESPERO QUE ESTÉS CARRASPEANDO TODA LA NOCHE PARA CELEBRARLO.

TENÍAS QUE SER DE AMURRIO COMO SANTIAGO ABASCAL. DILE AL CÁMARA QUE NO TE ENFOQUE DE PERFIL PORQUE TE DAS UN AIRE A ROSSY DE PALMA.

Her twin sister Patri was also a Spanish international handball player.

References

External links

Profile

1981 births
Living people
Sportspeople from Álava
Identical twins
Spanish female handball players
Twin sportspeople
Spanish twins
Handball players at the 2012 Summer Olympics
Handball players at the 2016 Summer Olympics
Olympic medalists in handball
Olympic handball players of Spain
Olympic bronze medalists for Spain 
Medalists at the 2012 Summer Olympics
Expatriate handball players
Spanish expatriate sportspeople in Denmark
Handball players from the Basque Country (autonomous community)